In television technology, Wide Screen Signaling (WSS) is digital metadata embedded in invisible part of the analog TV signal describing qualities of the broadcast, in particular the intended aspect ratio of the image. This allows television broadcasters to enable both 4:3 and 16:9 television sets to optimally present pictures transmitted in either format, by displaying them in full screen, letterbox, widescreen, pillar-box, zoomed letterbox, etc.

This development is related to introduction of widescreen TVs and broadcasts, with the PALplus system in the European Union (mid 1990s), the Clear-Vision system in Japan (early 1990s), and the need to downscale HD broadcasts to SD in the US. The bandwidth of the WSS signal is low enough to be recorded on VHS (at the time a popular home video recording technology). It is standardized on Rec. ITU-R BT.1119-2.

A modern digital equivalent would be the Active Format Description, a standard set of codes that can be sent in a MPEG video stream, with a similar set of aspect ratio possibilities.

625 line systems
For 625 line analog TV systems (like PAL or SECAM), the signal is placed in line 23. It begins with a run-in code and starts code followed by 14 bits of information, divided into four groups, as shown on the tables below (based on Rec. ITU-R BT.1119-2) :

Note: The transmitted aspect ratio is 4:3. Within this area a 14:9 window is protected, containing all the relevant picture content to allow a wide-screen display on a 16:9 television set.

525 line systems
525 line analog systems (like NTSC or PAL-M) made a provision for the use of pulses for signaling widescreen and other parameters, introduced with the development of Clear-Vision (EDTV-II), a NTSC-compatible Japanese system allowing widescreen broadcasts. On these systems the signals are present in lines 22 and 285, as 27 data bits, as defined by IEC 61880.

The following table shows the information present on the signal, based on Rec. ITU-R BT.1119-2 ("helper" signals are EDTV-II specific):

See also
PALplus
Clear-Vision
Active Format Description (AFD)
Teletext

References

External links 
Renesas AN9716, Widescreen Signaling (WSS) covering 625 lines and 525 lines standard.

Television technology

de:Wide Screen Signalling